Julien Boisselier (born 26 May 1970) is a French actor.

Life and career 
Boisselier was born and raised in Nantes before moving to Paris to study comedy at Le Cours Florent.  He dated acclaimed French actress Mélanie Laurent, though the two ended their relationship in February 2009.  She dedicated her 2006 César Award for Most Promising Actress to him, which she won for Je vais bien, ne t'en fais pas.

Filmography

Film 
 Dans un grand vent de fleurs (1996)
 De gré ou de force (1998)
 Nationale 7 (2000)
 Azzurro (2000)
 Quand on sera grand (2001)
 Les Portes de la gloire (2001)
 Un jeu d'enfants (2001)
 Les Acteurs anonymes (2001)
 Aime ton père (2002)
 Nos enfants chéris (2003)
 Le Convoyeur (2004)
 Clara et moi (2004)
 J'me sens pas belle (2004)
 Tout le plaisir est pour moi (2004)
 J'ai plein de projets (2006)
 On va s'aimer (2006)
 Je vais bien, ne t'en fais pas (2006)
 La dix-septième marche (2007)
 J'veux pas que tu t'en ailles (2007)
 Cortex (2007)
 Les femmes de l'ombre (2008)
 Cochon de Morin (2008)
 De moins en moins (2008)
 Skhizein (2008)
 Les dents de la nuit (2008)
 Henri IV (2009) as Henry of Navarre
 Sleepless Night (2011)
 The Chef (2012) by Daniel_Cohen
 Jamais le premier soir (2014)
 Bis (2015)
 Marseille (2016)
 Sous le même toit (2017)
 Quand on crie au loup (2019)

Television 
 La Deuxième Vérité (2001)
 Une deuxième chance (2003)
 La peine d'une mère (2004)
 Nos vies rêvées (2004)
 La nuit du meurtre (2004)
 Tout va bien, c'est Noël (2004)
 La parenthèse interdite (2005)
 Celle qui reste (2005)
 Le Grand Charles (2006)
 Des fleurs pour Algernon (2006)
 Vive la colo ! (2012–2013)
 Nina (2018)
 Les copains d'abord (2020)

Theatre 
Vie privée by Philip Barry (2009)

External links 

 

Living people
1970 births
French male film actors
French male television actors
20th-century French male actors
21st-century French male actors
Most Promising Actor Lumières Award winners
Cours Florent alumni